"I Can't Hear You" is a  song by American rock musician Donnie Iris from his 1980 album Back on the Streets. The song was released as a single one year later and reached #47 on the U.S. Billboard Mainstream Rock Tracks chart.

Charts

External links
Lyrics

Donnie Iris songs
1981 singles
Songs written by Mark Avsec
1980 songs
Songs written by Donnie Iris
Songs written by Marty Lee Hoenes
Songs written by Albritton McClain